The Herzog Mountains are a mountain range in Morobe Province, Papua New Guinea.  It contains the 1389 m Mount Herzog which lies about 22 km west of Lae.  Other mountains in the range include Garagos, Misantum, Shungol, Ngaroneno, and Sugarloaf.

References

Mountain ranges of Papua New Guinea
Morobe Province